Nationality words link to articles with information on the nation's poetry or literature (for instance, Irish or France).

Events

Works published

United Kingdom

 John Brown, On Liberty
 William Collins:
 Ode Occasion'd by the Death of Mr. Thomson, James Thomson died in August 1748
"The Passions"
 Thomas Cooke, An Ode on Beauty, published anonymously
 Joseph Dumbleton, "A Rhapsody on Rum", a popular, solemn poem by a Southern newspaper versifier describing how rum destroys a drinker; first published in the ' 'South Carolina Gazette' ' and reprinted in newspapers throughout English Colonial America
 Aaron Hill, Gideon; or, The Patriot
 Samuel Johnson, The Vanity of Human Wishes: The tenth satire of Juvenal, imitated
 Henry Jones, Poems on Several Occasions
 William Mason, Isis: An elegy
 Gilbert West, Odes of Pindar

Other
 Joseph Green, "Entertainment for a Winter's Evening," a satirical poem about Boston's first Masonic procession; published in Boston, Colonial America
 Ewald von Kleist, Spring; Germany
 Anonymous, Fuqek Nitħaddet Malta ("I am talking about you, Malta"), Malta, approximate date

Births
Death years link to the corresponding "[year] in poetry" article:
 April 19 – Ōta Nanpo (大田 南畝), the most oft-used pen name of Ōta Tan, whose other pen names include Yomo no Akara, Yomo Sanjin, Kyōkaen, and Shokusanjin 蜀山人 (died 1823), late Edo period Japanese poet and fiction writer
 May 4 – Charlotte Turner Smith (died 1806), English poet and novelist
 August 28 – Johann Wolfgang von Goethe (died 1832), German writer
 December 15 – James Graeme (died 1772), Scottish poet
 December 25 – Samuel Jackson Pratt (died 1814), English poet and writer
 Undated – Wang Yun (died 1819), Chinese poet and playwright during the Qing dynasty

Deaths
Birth years link to the corresponding "[year] in poetry" article:
 January 22 – Matthew Concanen (born 1701), Irish-born English poet and writer
 May – Samuel Boyse (born 1702/3), Irish poet
 June 18 – Ambrose Philips (born 1674), English poet and politician
 August 13 – Johann Elias Schlegel (born 1719), German critic and poet

See also

Poetry
List of years in poetry
List of years in literature

Notes

18th-century poetry
Poetry